The International Clinical Trials Registry Platform (ICTRP) is a platform for the registration of clinical trials operated by the World Health Organization.

The ICTRP combines data from multiple cooperating clinical trials registries to generate a global view of clinical trials worldwide, with a search portal that allows access to the entire dataset. It requires a minimum standard set of database fields, the   WHO Trial Registration Data Set, to be present for a trial to be registered. All entries are given a Universal Trial Number (UTN) that identifies them uniquely.

The organization has sought to assist various national governments in establishing their own clinical trials databases.

, it combines data from the following primary source registries:

 Australian New Zealand Clinical Trials Registry (ANZCTR)
 Brazilian Clinical Trials Registry (ReBec) 
 Chinese Clinical Trial Registry (ChiCTR)
 Clinical Research Information Service (CRiS), Republic of Korea 
 Clinical Trials Registry - India (CTRI)
 Cuban Public Registry of Clinical Trials (RPCEC)
 EU Clinical Trials Register (EU-CTR)
 German Clinical Trials Register (DRKS)
 Iranian Registry of Clinical Trials (IRCT) 
 ISRCTN Registry (UK; originally an abbreviation for "International Standard Randomised Controlled Trial Number") 
 Japan Primary Registries Network (JPRN)
 Lebanese Clinical Trials Registry (LBCTR)
 Netherlands National Trial Register (NTR)
 Thai Clinical Trials Registry (TCTR) 
 Pan African Clinical Trial Registry (PACTR)
 Peruvian Clinical Trial Registry (REPEC) 
 Sri Lanka Clinical Trials Registry (SLCTR)

See also 
 ClinicalTrials.gov
 Clinical trial registration
 List of clinical trial registries

References

External links

Databases
Clinical trials